Triaeris is a genus of goblin spiders erected by Eugène Simon in 1890 for the species Triaeris stenaspis. It was described from females from the Lesser Antilles; specimens were found later in heated greenhouses around Europe. No males of T. stenaspis have ever been found and the species may be parthenogenetic. Its taxonomy is confused, and the number of species that should be placed in the genus is unclear. In 2012, Norman I. Platnick and co-authors described the genus Triaeris as "an enigma wrapped around a mystery". They consider that most species assigned to the genus after Simon in 1890 and before 2012 do not belong to Triaeris.

Species 
, the World Spider Catalog accepted the following species. The assignment to groups is based on Platnick et al. (2012).

 True species of Triaeris
Triaeris fako Platnick et al., 2012 – Cameroon
Triaeris ibadan Platnick et al., 2012 – Nigeria
Triaeris menchum Platnick et al., 2012 – Cameroon
Triaeris moca Platnick et al., 2012 – Bioko
Triaeris oku Platnick et al., 2012 – Cameroon
Triaeris stenaspis Simon, 1891 (type species) – Pantropical, Iran; introduced into Europe
Triaeris togo Platnick et al., 2012 – Togo

 African species that should be placed in other related genera
Triaeris equestris Simon, 1907 – Príncipe
Triaeris macrophthalmus Berland, 1914 – Kenya

 Indian species considered misidentified ("wildly misplaced")
Triaeris barela Gajbe, 2004 – India
Triaeris khashiensis Tikader, 1966 – India
Triaeris manii Tikader & Malhotra, 1974 – India
Triaeris melghaticus Bastawade, 2005 – India
Triaeris nagarensis Tikader & Malhotra, 1974 – India
Triaeris nagpurensis Tikader & Malhotra, 1974 – India
Triaeris poonaensis Tikader & Malhotra, 1974 – India

References

Oonopidae
Araneomorphae genera
Spiders of Africa
Spiders of Asia
Spiders of the Indian subcontinent